Riner is a surname. Notable people with the surname include:

Claudia Riner (born 1948), American politician
John Alden Riner (1850–1923), American judge
Nicole Riner (born 1990), Swiss tennis player
Teddy Riner (born 1989), French judoka
Tom Riner (born 1946), American politician
William A. Riner (1878-1955), American judge